Karassery is a village and one of the suburbs in the south - eastern side of kozhikode district in Kerala. Nearby places are Mukkam, Thiruvambady, Koodaranji and Kodiyathur. One of the most famous business place of 1970's in Kozhikode. More than 100 loads of Forest Woods were shipped to Kallai (calicut) through Iruvanjippuzha river on every week. The nearest town is mukkam and it has close  ties with mukkam for shopping, entertainment etc. Iruvanjippuzha river separates both places.

References 

Villages in Kozhikode district
Kozhikode east